Foxfire is a 1996 American teen drama film directed by Annette Haywood-Carter. Based on the Joyce Carol Oates novel Foxfire: Confessions of a Girl Gang, it examines the coming of age of four high school girls who meet up with a mysterious and beautiful drifter.

Plot
Maddie Wirtz is a high school senior living in the suburbs of Portland, Oregon. Her plans to coast through her last school year before college are waylaid when she meets another teenage girl, "Legs," a drifter who takes shelter from the rain inside Maddie's school. The same day she meets them, Legs convinces Maddie and fellow students Rita Faldes and Violet Kahn to confront Mr. Buttinger, a teacher who has been sexually harassing Rita and Violet. Maddie, Rita, and Violet flee after the confrontation turns violent, witnessed by student Goldie Goldman, who flees with them. Later, Legs finds Maddie at her house from the address in a notebook Maddie dropped in Mr. Buttinger's classroom. Legs spends the night at Maddie's house and bonds with her further in the morning before school.

At school, Maddie, Rita, Violet, and Goldie are suspended for the confrontation of Mr. Buttinger, despite their explanation of what happened. After getting kicked out of school, the girls go to an abandoned house where Maddie suggested Legs stay, finding Legs there. All five girls quickly form a close bond, with the abandoned house as their "headquarters" and engaging in further acts of rebellion, such as breaking into the school to retrieve part of Maddie's art school application (which the principal refused to let her get before she got kicked out) and Legs tattooing a flame on all of them. Legs and Maddie also learn Goldie's father physically abuses her. Everything culminates when the girls crash a car stolen from a group of boys who were about to rape Maddie in "revenge" for what happened to Mr. Buttinger.

Though not seriously injured, the girls go on trial for stealing the car, with the boys and one of their girlfriends, Cindy, lying about the events leading up to it. Legs is sent to a juvenile prison and the group flounders without her, with Goldie starting to use heroin. Eventually, Cindy, feeling guilty, tells the judge the truth, leading to Legs' release.

The girls' reunion is tempered by Legs learning of Goldie's addiction; Maddie has taken her to the abandoned house to detox. In an effort to help her, Legs leads Maddie, Rita, and Violet to Goldie's house to demand $10,000 from her parents to send Goldie to rehab. The situation escalates when Goldie's father refuses and Legs, holding him at gunpoint, forces the others to take him to the abandoned house. He is tied to a chair while the girls try to think of what to do next, and the tension rises as Legs begins taking her own paternal frustrations out on him. In the midst of the chaos, Rita accidentally shoots Goldie's father in the shoulder.

Panic ensues and the girls resolve to get Goldie's father to the hospital. When Goldie, Rita, and Violet leave with Goldie's father, Maddie realizes Legs is missing. She finds Legs walking along the bridge, looking for a ride to another town. Both girls make proposals, Maddie for Legs to stay with her and the others and Legs for Maddie to join her on the road. Sad but resolute, the two eventually go their separate ways. Legs gets a truck to stop and boards as Maddie watches it disappear.

In a voice-over, it is revealed that Maddie reunited with her boyfriend, finished high school, and went on to attend art school in New York City. She travels the world, always stopping at airports and bus stops along the way. Although none of the group ever see Legs again, they still get together once in a while and strengthen their bond over the past.

Cast
 Hedy Burress as Madeline "Maddie" Wirtz
 Angelina Jolie as Margaret "Legs" Sadovsky
 Jenny Lewis as Rita Faldes
 Jenny Shimizu as "Goldie" Goldman
 Cathy Moriarty as Martha Wirtz
 Sarah Rosenberg as Violet Kahn
 Michelle Brookhurst as Cindy
 Dash Mihok as Dana Taylor 
 Peter Facinelli as Ethan Bixby
 Richard Beymer as Mr. Parks
 Fran Bennett as Judge Holifield
 John Diehl as Mr. Buttinger
 Chris Mulkey as Dan Goldman
 Jay Acovone as Chuck

Production
The film was shot in Portland, Oregon.

Reception
On Rotten Tomatoes it has an approval rating of 33% based on reviews from 12 critics.

References

External links
 
 

1996 films
1996 drama films
1996 independent films
1996 LGBT-related films
1990s coming-of-age drama films
1990s female buddy films
1990s feminist films
1990s high school films
1990s teen drama films
American coming-of-age drama films
American female buddy films
American feminist films
American high school films
American independent films
American teen drama films
American teen LGBT-related films
1990s English-language films
Films about educators
Films about scandalous teacher–student relationships
Films about sexual harassment
Films based on American novels
Films set in Portland, Oregon
Films shot in Portland, Oregon
Rysher Entertainment films
Films scored by Michel Colombier
1990s American films
English-language drama films